Tweedie Waititi is a New Zealand film director and producer. The whāngai sister of Taika Waititi, she is best known for her work co-directing production company Matewa Media, which since 2016 has produced Māori language versions of Disney animated films.

Biography 

Waititi grew up in the Te Whānau-ā-Apanui community of Waihau Bay in the Bay of Plenty. She is the first cousin of Taika Waititi, but as they were raised together through whāngai adoption, they consider each other siblings. Waititi studied film at the South Seas Film & Television School. In 2012, she worked as a language coach for the Rachel House-directed production of William Shakespeare's Troilus and Cressida, performed in Māori.

In 2017, Waititi formed the production company Matewa Media alongside filmmaker (and then wife of her cousin Taika Waititi) Chelsea Winstanley. The company was named for Waititi's grandmother Matewa Delamere (1926-1998). Waititi and Winstanley were inspired to create Te Reo Māori (Māori language) adaptations of Disney films while watching Waititi's toddlers watch Moana on repeat, and hoping that they would be able to experience the film in Māori. Waititi's cousin Taika Waititi, who had worked on an early draft of the English language version of the film, proposed the idea to Disney, who agreed and allowed Matewa Media to start work on the film. Moana Reo Māori was released in 2017, coinciding with Te Wiki o te Reo Māori (Māori Language Week) 2017. Waititi also translated the subtitles for her cousin's film Thor: Ragnarok into te reo, for the home media and aircraft release of the film.

In 2020, Waititi worked as a script consultant on the LGBT film Rūrangi, to help develop authentic Māori storylines for the production. Waititi won the Department of Post Best New Zealand Film at the Show Me Shorts film festival in 2020, for producing the short film Daddy's Girl (Kōtiro). The following year, she translated the song "Bathe in the River" (2006) by Hollie Smith into Māori, as a part of the Waiata / Anthems project.

In 2022, Waititi produced two te reo Māori adaptations of Disney films: The Lion King, released during Matariki and Frozen, to be released in 2022.

Artistry 

Waititi represents a range of Māori dialects in her adaptations. For The Lion King, different animals were represented with Waikato Tainui and Ngāi Tūhoe dialects. For Frozen, Waititi chose to represent southern Ngāi Tahu dialects, to match the snowy atmosphere of the film.

Filmography

Films

References

21st-century New Zealand writers
21st-century screenwriters
Indigenous filmmakers in New Zealand
Living people
Māori-language film directors
New Zealand film directors
New Zealand Māori film producers
New Zealand screenwriters
New Zealand women film directors
New Zealand women film producers
New Zealand women screenwriters
People from the Bay of Plenty Region
Rongowhakaata people
Te Whānau-ā-Apanui people
Tweedie
1985 births